Elizabeth Marika Armanto (born January 26, 1993) is an American-Finnish professional skateboarder.

Early life and career 
Armanto was born to a Finnish father and an American mother. She holds dual citizenship in the United States and Finland. She is of Filipino descent through her maternal grandfather.

Armanto grew up in Santa Monica, California. She started skating in 2007 with her younger brother and developed a love for skating bowls and vert.

Armanto has won over 30 skateboarding awards. In 2010, 2011 and 2012, she placed first overall in the World Cup of Skateboarding points race. In 2013, Armanto won silver at the first ever Women's Skateboard Park event at X Games in Barcelona, Spain. She won the 2014 Van Doren Invitational in Huntington Beach, California.

In 2018, Armanto became the first female skater to complete The Loop, a 360-degree ramp.

In January 2019, Armanto revealed that she joined the Finnish skateboarding national team and would represent the country at the 2020 Summer Olympics in Tokyo.

Personal life 
Armanto married Belgian skateboarder, Axel Cruysberghs, on October 16, 2020.

Video game appearances 
Armanto is a playable character in the video games Tony Hawk's Shred Session, Tony Hawk's Pro Skater 5 and Tony Hawk's Pro Skater 1 + 2.

Sports diplomacy 
In 2019, Armanto traveled to Denmark as a Sports Envoy for the U.S. State Department's Sports Diplomacy Office.

References

External links 

 Lizzie Armanto at The Boardr

Living people
1993 births
American skateboarders
Finnish skateboarders
Female skateboarders
Sportspeople from California
X Games athletes
American people of Finnish descent
Finnish people of American descent
American people of Filipino descent
Finnish people of Filipino descent
Skateboarders at the 2020 Summer Olympics
Olympic skateboarders of Finland